Alexandre Mas (born c. 1978) is William S. Tod Professor of Economics and Public Affairs at Princeton University, Director of the Industrial Relations Section at Princeton University, and Director of the Labor Studies program of the National Bureau of Economic Research.  He is a former Chief Economist of the United States Department of Labor and Associate Director for Economic Policy at the Office of Management and Budget.

Selected works
 Mas, Alexandre, and Enrico Moretti. "Peers at work." American Economic Review 99, no. 1 (2009): 112-45.
 Card, David, Alexandre Mas, Enrico Moretti, and Emmanuel Saez. "Inequality at work: The effect of peer salaries on job satisfaction." American Economic Review 102, no. 6 (2012): 2981-3003.
 Card, David, Alexandre Mas, and Jesse Rothstein. "Tipping and the Dynamics of Segregation." The Quarterly Journal of Economics 123, no. 1 (2008): 177-218.
 Mas, Alexandre. "Pay, reference points, and police performance." The Quarterly Journal of Economics 121, no. 3 (2006): 783-821.
 Mas, Alexandre, and Amanda Pallais. "Valuing alternative work arrangements." American Economic Review 107, no. 12 (2017): 3722-59.

References

External links

21st-century American economists
Chief Economists of the United States Department of Labor
1977 births
Living people
Macalester College alumni
Labor economists
Economics journal editors
Fellows of the Econometric Society